Neoterebra is a genus of marine snails, gastropod molluscs in the family Terebridae, subfamily Terebrinae.

Species
Species within the genus Neoterebra include:
 
 Neoterebra acrior (Dall, 1889)
 Neoterebra alagoensis (S. Lima, Tenorio & Barros, 2007)
 Neoterebra alba (Gray, 1834)
 Neoterebra allyni (Bratcher & R. D. Burch, 1970)
 Neoterebra angelli (J. Gibson-Smith & W. Gibson-Smith, 1984)
 Neoterebra arcas (Abbott, 1954)
 Neoterebra armillata (Hinds, 1844)
 Neoterebra assu (Simone, 2012)
 Neoterebra berryi (G. B. Campbell, 1961)
 Neoterebra biminiensis (Petuch, 1987)
 Neoterebra brandi (Bratcher & R. D. Burch, 1970)
 Neoterebra brasiliensis (E. A. Smith, 1873)
 Neoterebra bridgesi (Dall, 1908)
 Neoterebra carolae (Bratcher, 1979)
 Neoterebra churea (G. B. Campbell, 1964)
 Neoterebra colombiensis (Simone & Gracia, 2006)
 Neoterebra concava (Say, 1826)
 Neoterebra corintoensis (Pilsbry & H. N. Lowe, 1932)
 Neoterebra crassireticula (Simone, 1999)
 Neoterebra crenifera (Deshayes, 1859)
 Neoterebra curacaoensis (De Jong & Coomans, 1988)
 Neoterebra dislocata (Say, 1822)
 Neoterebra doellojuradoi (Carcelles, 1953)
 Neoterebra elata (Hinds, 1844)
 Neoterebra frigata (Hinds, 1844)
 Neoterebra glauca (Hinds, 1844)
 Neoterebra glossema (Schwengel, 1942)
 Neoterebra guadeloupensis Malcolm, Terryn & Fedosov, 2020
 Neoterebra guayaquilensis (E. A. Smith, 1880)
 Neoterebra hancocki (Bratcher & R. D. Burch, 1970)
 Neoterebra hemphilli (Vanatta, 1924)
 Neoterebra hondurasiensis (Gargiulo, 2016)
 Neoterebra incisa (Faber, 2007)
 Neoterebra intertincta (Hinds, 1844)
 Neoterebra intumescyra (S. Lima, Tenorio & Barros, 2007)
 Neoterebra jacquelinae (Bratcher & R. D. Burch, 1970)
 Neoterebra juanica (Dall & Simpson, 1901)
 Neoterebra lamyi (Terryn, 2011)
 Neoterebra larvaeformis (Hinds, 1844)
 Neoterebra leptapsis (Simone, 1999)
 Neoterebra limatula (Dall, 1889)
 Neoterebra lucana (Dall, 1908)
 Neoterebra mugridgeae (García, 1999)
 Neoterebra nassula (Dall, 1889)
 Neoterebra pacei (Petuch, 1987)
 Neoterebra panamensis (Dall, 1908)
 Neoterebra pedroana (Dall, 1908)
 Neoterebra plicata (Gray, 1834)
 Neoterebra protexta (Conrad, 1846)
 Neoterebra puncturosa (Berry, 1959)
 Neoterebra rancheria (Bratcher, 1988)
 Neoterebra riosi (Bratcher & Cernohorsky, 1985)
 Neoterebra roperi (Pilsbry & H. N. Lowe, 1932)
 Neoterebra rushii (Dall, 1889)
 Neoterebra sanjuanensis (Pilsbry & H. N. Lowe, 1932)
 Neoterebra shyana (Bratcher & R. D. Burch, 1970)
 Neoterebra simonei (S. Lima, Tenorio & Barros, 2007)
 Neoterebra specillata (Hinds, 1844)
 Neoterebra spirosulcata (Simone, 1999)
 Neoterebra sterigma (Simone, 1999)
 Neoterebra sterigmoides (Simone & Gracia, 2006)
 Neoterebra stohleri (Bratcher & R. D. Burch, 1970)
 Neoterebra tiarella (Deshayes, 1857)
 Neoterebra variegata (Gray, 1834)
 Neoterebra vinosa (Dall, 1889)

References

External links
 Fedosov, A. E.; Malcolm, G.; Terryn, Y.; Gorson, J.; Modica, M. V.; Holford, M.; Puillandre, N. (2020). Phylogenetic classification of the family Terebridae (Neogastropoda: Conoidea). Journal of Molluscan Studies

Terebridae